The Woman I've Become may refer to:
 The Woman I've Become (album), a 2006 album by Jill Johnson
 The Woman I've Become (EP), a 2021 EP by Jessie James Decker